Denbighshire County Council is the unitary local authority for the county of Denbighshire, one of the principal areas of Wales. The council is based at County Hall in Ruthin.

Elections take place every five years. The last election was on 5 May 2022. The council is under no overall control, being administered by a multi-party cabinet led by Jason McLellan of the Labour Party.

History
Denbighshire County Council was first created in 1889 under the Local Government Act 1888, which established elected county councils to take over the administrative functions of the quarter sessions. That county council and the administrative county of Denbighshire were abolished in 1974, when the area merged with neighbouring Flintshire to become the new county of Clwyd, except for six parishes on the western edge of Denbighshire in the Conwy valley, which went instead to the Aberconwy district of Gwynedd. The remainder of the former administrative county of Denbighshire was split between three of the six districts of Clwyd: Colwyn, Glyndŵr, and Wrexham Maelor.

Under the Local Government (Wales) Act 1994, Clwyd County Council and the county's constituent districts were abolished, being replaced by principal areas, whose councils perform the functions which had previously been divided between the county and district councils. A new principal area and county of Denbighshire was created with effect from 1 April 1996, covering most of Glyndŵr, two communities from Colwyn, and all of Rhuddlan (the latter having been created in 1974 from areas in Flintshire rather than Denbighshire). The new Denbighshire County Council created in 1996 therefore covers a different area to the pre-1974 county.

Political control
The first election to the new council was held in 1995, initially operating as a shadow authority before coming into its powers on 1 April 1996. Political control of the council since 1996 has been as follows: The last election was 5 May 2022 when the number of councillors elected increased from 47 to 48.

Leadership
The leaders of the council since 2000 have been:

Since May 2022 the council has been led by Jason McLellan, of Labour. The cabinet is formed of six Labour and three Plaid Cymru councillors. He was preceded by Hugh Evans, a farmer from Llanelidan, who led the council for over 14 years, who was first elected as leader of the council on 6 November 2007. This followed a vote of no confidence in the previous leader, Rhiannon Hughes, two weeks beforehand. Prior to Hughes, Plaid Cymru councillor Eryl Williams was leader, from 2002 until 2004.

From April 2022 the council leader was paid a salary of £53,550.

Current composition
As of 5 May 2022:

One seat (Alyn Valley, Con) was elected unopposed at the 2022 election.

Elections
Summary of the council composition after council elections, click on the year for full details of each election.

Party with the most elected councillors in bold. Coalition agreements in notes column.

Premises
The council is based at County Hall in Ruthin. The building was originally built in 1909 for the old Denbighshire County Council. Between 1974 and 1996 the building served as the headquarters of Glyndŵr District Council. Most of the building was demolished in 2002 and a modern building built behind the retained frontage of the 1909 original, with the rebuilt headquarters being completed in 2004. The council also has offices at Russell House on Churton Road in Rhyl, which had been built in 1991 for the former Rhuddlan Borough Council.

Electoral divisions
The county borough is divided into 29 electoral wards returning 48 councillors.  Few communities in Denbighshire are coterminous with electoral wards.  The following table lists council wards, communities and associated geographical areas based on the 2017 election:

* = Communities which elect a community council
c = Ward coterminous with community of the same name

Democratic Alliance of Wales 

The Democratic Alliance of Wales (DAW) was a political party partly comprising former Labour Party members,

The DAW stood 14 candidates in the 1999 Denbighshire Council election, with five winning seats in Prestatyn. The three successful DAW candidates in Prestatyn North—Michael German, Isobel German and Jeff Hughes—had been elected as Labour councillors at the 1995 elections. One of the DAW founders, Gwynn Clague, was elected as a county councillor for Prestatyn South West, and became mayor of Prestatyn Town Council. He was particularly known for his criticisms of the county council's performance, as well as the town council's finances. By October 2003, he had left DAW and was unaligned.

At the 2004 all-council election, the three DAW councillors in the Prestatyn North ward stood for re-election, retaining their seats.

Following the rejection of Denbighshire council leader Rhiannon Hughes in October 2007, DAW group leader Mike German was touted as a possible successor.

At the 2008 all-council election, the three remaining DAW councillors stood as Independents, losing to the Conservatives.

References

External links
Denbighshire County Council (official site)

Government of Denbighshire
County councils of Wales
Local authorities of Wales